Pompierre is a neighbourhood (quartier) of Terre-de-Haut Island, located in the commune of Terre-de-Haut, Les Saintes, Guadeloupe, the Caribbean. It is located in the northeastern part of the island. The Beach of Bay of Pompierre is situated on this quarter.

Populated places in Îles des Saintes
Quartiers of Îles des Saintes